Problepsis transposita is a moth of the  family Geometridae. It is found in New Guinea and Australia.

References

Moths described in 1903
Scopulini
Moths of New Guinea
Moths of Australia